Scream of the Demon Lover (released in Italy as Il castello dalle porte di fuoco/ The Castle With the Door of Fire) is a Spanish-Italian horror film, originally written under the title Ivanna. It was released in France as Le Monstre du château, and in Mexico as El Castillo di Frankestein. It was written by Enrico Colombo and Maria del Carmen Martinez Roman, with input from the director Jose Luis Merino. Roger Corman bought the film for his New World Pictures to put on a drive-in double bill with The Velvet Vampire. The film was cut in the U.S. from 98 minutes to only 78 minutes, eliminating some of the nudity/ gore.

Plot

A beautiful young woman named Ivanna travels to a remote estate to seek employment as a biochemist for Baron Janos Dalmar. She finds herself attracted to him, so she immerses herself in her work to suppress her lusty desires. A rash of rather brutal murders occurs in the area, and she soon discovers that the Baron is not what he seems. Not long thereafter, the Baron transforms into a demon, and the beautiful young woman becomes his personal love slave.

Cast

 Erna Schurer as Ivanna Rakowski
 Carlos Quiney as Janos Dalmar
 Agostina Belli as Christiana the maid
 Christiana Galloni as Olga
 Antonio Jimenez Escribano as the butler
 Enzo Fisichella as Igor
 Ezio Sancrotti as Driver/ Rapist
 Mariano Vidal Molina as the Inspector
 Franco Moraldi as the Mayor
 Giancarlo Fantini as the Doctor
 Renato Paracchi as the police writer
 Javier de Rivera as the Judge
 Silvia Faver as the Voice of Ivanna (in U.S. dubbed prints)

References

External links
 
 Scream of the Demon Lover at TCMDB
 Scream of the Demon Lover at Variety Distribution
 Scream of the Demon Lover at Letterbox DVD

1970s exploitation films
1970 horror films
1970 films
New World Pictures films
Italian horror films
Spanish horror films
English-language Italian films
English-language Spanish films
1970s English-language films
1970s Italian films